Campbell Township is one of ten townships in Warrick County, Indiana, United States. As of the 2010 census, its population was 906 and it contained 353 housing units.

History
Campbell Township was organized before 1823. The township was named for Thomas Campbell, a pioneer settler.

Geography

Unincorporated towns
 Baugh City at 
 Fisherville at 
 Jarretts at 
 Millersburg at 
 Saint John at 
(This list is based on USGS data and may include former settlements.)

Adjacent townships
 Greer Township (north)
 Hart Township (northeast)
 Boon Township (east)
 Ohio Township (south)
 Knight Township, Vanderburgh County (southwest)
 Center Township, Vanderburgh County (west)
 Scott Township, Vanderburgh County (west)

Cemeteries
The township contains these nine cemeteries: Asbury, Crossroad, Miller Cemetery, Millersburg, Hay, Weyerbacher Rd., Gander, St. Johns, and Feagley.  Other small private cemeteries may exist on open land.  Mining activities may have obscured the sites for certain small private cemeteries in Campbell Township.  Miller Cemetery may readily be found near the NW corner of the intersection of State Street and Miller, Cemetery Road, formerly called old New Harmony Road.

School districts
 Warrick County School Corporation

Political districts
 Indiana's 8th congressional district
 State House District 75
 State Senate District 50

References
 United States Census Bureau 2007 TIGER/Line Shapefiles
 United States Board on Geographic Names (GNIS)
 IndianaMap

External links
 Indiana Township Association
 United Township Association of Indiana

Townships in Warrick County, Indiana
Townships in Indiana